Valeria Patiuk (born 11 May 1996 in Zaporizhia, Ukraine) is an Israeli tennis player.

Patiuk has won one singles and two doubles titles on the ITF tour in her career. On 19 December 2011, she reached her best singles ranking of world number 640. On 25 February 2013, she peaked at world number 603 in the doubles rankings.

Patiuk made her debut for the Israel Fed Cup team in 2011, losing to Dia Evtimova and Magdalena Maleeva of Bulgaria in doubles.

ITF finals (3–2)

Singles (1–0)

Doubles (2–2)

Fed Cup participation

Doubles

References 

 
 
 

1996 births
Living people
Sportspeople from Zaporizhzhia
Israeli female tennis players
Ukrainian emigrants to Israel
Ukrainian people of Israeli descent
Israeli people of Ukrainian descent
Israeli people of Soviet descent